Lorne Bobkin (born 30 October 1965) is a Canadian gymnast. He competed in eight events at the 1988 Summer Olympics.

References

External links
 

1965 births
Living people
Canadian male artistic gymnasts
Olympic gymnasts of Canada
Gymnasts at the 1988 Summer Olympics
Gymnasts from Toronto
Commonwealth Games medallists in gymnastics
Commonwealth Games gold medallists for Canada
Gymnasts at the 1990 Commonwealth Games
20th-century Canadian people
21st-century Canadian people
Medallists at the 1990 Commonwealth Games